Arthur Montague Septimus Jones was an Australian rules footballer who played for the Fitzroy Football Club in the Victorian Football League. He was killed on 7 August 1915 in Ottoman Turkey during World War I.

Family
The son of Railton farmers Henry Jones and Martha Jones, née Wells, he was born on 12 October 1891.

Football
He played for the Lefroy Football Club in 1912 and 1913. Recruited from Lefroy, he played in seven matches for the Fitzroy First XVIII in 1914; the first being the (round 2) match against Richmond, on 2 May 1914, when he took the place of an injured Artie Harrison.

Military
He enlisted in the First AIF on 21 October 1914, and served in the 8th Australian Light Horse Regiment. He was killed in action on 7 August 1915 at Gallipoli.

See also
 List of Victorian Football League players who died on active service

Footnotes

References
 
 First World War Nominal Roll: Arthur Jones (828).
 Roll of Honour: Trooper Arthur M Jones (828), Australian War Museum.
 Holmesby, Russell & Main, Jim (2007). The Encyclopedia of AFL Footballers. 7th ed. Melbourne: Bas Publishing.

1891 births
1915 deaths
Australian rules footballers from Tasmania
Fitzroy Football Club players
Lefroy Football Club players
Australian military personnel killed in World War I